Immigrant is the second studio album by Palestinian-Canadian rapper Belly. It was released through Roc Nation and XO Records on 12 October 2018. The album features guest appearances from Zack, Meek Mill, M.I.A., Yo Gotti, Metro Boomin, French Montana, the Weeknd, and Nav.

Background 

The album was teased numerous times late 2017, with the album title then being "Midnight Zone". Belly also shared in studio images of himself working alongside American rapper Jay-Z, which speculated the two working on a song together.
Following the release of "Maintain", featuring Canadian rapper and fellow labelmate Nav, Belly was attacked by security guards at the Coachella event, during The Weeknd's headlining set.
Belly responded with a number of tweets; "20 of you pussies couldn’t take me off my feet"  and "no negative bullshit can steal my joy.. I performed the best show of my life, on 4/20 at Coachella ‼️I really came from nothing, and I’m still here.. it’s gotta mean something." The album was officially announced on social media on 2 September 2018, with a new album title and an official release date, where he stated the following; "With everything going on, I can’t sit by and say nothing. I decided to speak my truths. my album is now called || IMMIGRANT || out on October 12 || xotwod || RN"

Singles 
The lead single of the album, "Maintain", featuring Canadian rapper and fellow labelmate Nav, was released on 6 April 2018. The second single, "What You Want", featuring Canadian singer-songwriter and fellow label boss, the Weeknd, was released on 24 May 2018.

Commercial performance 

Immigrant debuted at 169 on the US Billboard 200 chart and at 31 on the Canadian Albums Chart.

Track listing

Notes
  signifies a co-producer.

Sample credits
 "Who Hurt You" samples "The Zone", performed by the Weeknd featuring Drake.

Personnel
Credits adapted from the album's liner notes and Tidal.

Musicians

 Belly – primary artist 
 Zack – featured artist 
 Meek Mill – featured artist 
 M.I.A. – featured artist 
 Yo Gotti – featured artist 
 Metro Boomin – featured artist 
 French Montana – featured artist 
 The Weeknd – featured artist 
 Nav – featured artist

Technical

 Jaycen Joshua – mixing , studio personnel 
 Chris Athens – mastering , studio personnel 
 Faris Al-Majed – recording , studio personnel , programming , engineering 
 Jacob Richards – assistant mixing , studio personnel 
 Mike Seaberg – assistant mixing , studio personnel 
 Rashawn Mclean – assistant mixing , studio personnel 
 Ben Billions – programming 
 Baruch "Mixx" Nembhard – mixing , engineering , studio personnel 
 David Nakaji – assistant mixing , studio personnel 
 Iván Jiménez – assistant mixing , studio personnel 
 Richard Muñoz – programming 
 DaHeala – programming 
 Rex Kudo – programming 
 Anthony Cruz – recording , studio personnel 
 Metro Boomin – programming 
 Southside – programming 
 Shin Kamiyama – engineering , studio personnel 
 Nav – programming 
 DannyBoyStyles – recording , studio personnel 
 Austin Powerz – programming 
 TrakGirl – programming

Charts

References

2018 albums
Belly (rapper) albums
Albums produced by Cirkut
Albums produced by Metro Boomin
Albums produced by Nav (rapper)
Albums produced by Southside (record producer)